Tarantino is an Italian word meaning "originating from Taranto", a town in Apulia in Southern Italy. It is used, for example, as the demonym for Taranto and for the Tarantino dialect of the Sicilian language.

List
Notable people with the surname include:

Alexa Tarantino (born 1992), American jazz musician
Giuseppe Tarantino (1857–1950), Italian philosopher
Luigi Tarantino (born 1972), Italian Olympic fencer
Javier Tarantino (born 1984), Spanish footballer
Jevon Tarantino (born 1984), American springboard diver
Massimo Tarantino (born 1971), Italian footballer
Nazzareno Tarantino (born 1979), Italian footballer
Quentin Tarantino (born 1963), American film director, screenwriter, and actor
Ray Tarantino (born 1976), photographer and songwriter of Italian descent
Tarina Tarantino, American jewelry designer
Tonette Walker (née Tarantino; born 1955), First Lady of Wisconsin
Tony Tarantino (born 1940), American actor, father of Quentin Tarantino

See also

Tarantini
Tarantism
Tarantella
Tarantula

Surnames
Italian-language surnames